Moerdijk is a municipality and a town in the South of the Netherlands, in the province of North Brabant.

History 
The municipality of Moerdijk was founded in 1997 following the merger of the municipalities of Fijnaart en Heijningen, Klundert, Standdaarbuiten, Willemstad, and Zevenbergen. At that time the new municipality was called Zevenbergen. The name changed to Moerdijk on 1 April 1998.
 List of mayors of Moerdijk

Population centres

Topography

Dutch Topographic map of the municipality of Moerdijk, June 2015

The village of Moerdijk 
The village of Moerdijk is one of the smaller villages of the municipality. Population as of 2002 is 1,205. Moerdijk is however a well-known name in the Netherlands, because of the large Moerdijk industrial area, with a large power plant, and because of the well-known Moerdijk bridges (highway and railway bridges) across the Hollands Diep. This was the last bridge available for the retreat from the vital Scheldt Estuary of the rapidly collapsing German defences near Antwerp in World War II. (Noteworthy as well, the Moerdijk bridges were one of the first targets of guided, or "smart bombs"- by American heavy bombers in late 1944.) 

Moerdijk made headlines on January 5, 2011, because of a large fire at Chemie-Pack (a firm processing numerous chemicals) causing a large cloud of toxic smoke to blow over the surrounding area, mostly to the north of Moerdijk.

Above the Moerdijk (meaning "north of Moerdijk") is used as an expression in Belgium and the southern parts of the Netherlands to mean "in the Netherlands" or "in Holland".

Below the Moerdijk (meaning "south of Moerdijk" or "below the major rivers") is also a Dutch expression for the Catholic provinces North Brabant and Limburg.

Across the Moerdijk is used by either party to mean the other one.

Zevenbergen 
Zevenbergen is the largest town of the municipality (population : 14,006). It is located about 10 km northwest of Breda. It received city rights in 1427.

Zevenbergen has a train station with connections to Dordrecht and Roosendaal.

Transport 

Close to Hollands Diep, the area is now used for industrial movements by water, with great inland access as well the access into the North Sea, transport company Van der Vlist have their own port located in the area, and many other transport companies have nearby offices.

Notable people 

 Emanuel Sweert (1552 in Zevenbergen – 1612) a Dutch painter and nurseryman
 François Vranck (ca. 1555 in Zevenbergen – 1617) a Dutch lawyer and statesman, helped found the Dutch Republic
 Hendrick Berckman (1629 in Klundert – 1679) a Dutch Golden Age painter
 Jaap Burger (1904 in Willemstad – 1986) a Dutch politician
 Leo Riemens (1910 in Zevenbergen – 1985) a Dutch musicologist and cultural journalist
 Fons van der Stee (1928 in Zevenbergen – 1999) a Dutch politician
 Ad Bax (born 1956 in Zevenbergen) a Dutch-American molecular biophysicist
 Frans Bauer (born 1973 in Roosendaal) a Dutch singer of levenslied
 O'G3NE (formed 2007 in Fijnaart) a Dutch three-piece girl group

Sport 
 Piet van der Horst (1903 in Klundert – 1983) a Dutch racing cyclist, silver medallist at the 1928 Summer Olympics
 Nico van Gageldonk (1913 in Klundert – 1995) a Dutch cyclist, competed at the 1936 Summer Olympics
 Angelique Seriese (born 1968 in Zevenbergen) a former Dutch judoka, gold medallist at the 1988 Summer Olympics

Gallery

References

External links 

 

 
Municipalities of North Brabant
Populated places in North Brabant
Municipalities of the Netherlands established in 1998